This is a list of Canadians, people who are identified with Canada through residential, legal, historical, or cultural means, grouped by their area of notability.

Architects
 Hans Blumenfeld OC (1892–1988) – architect and city planner
 Joan Burt (1930–2021) – architect
 Douglas Cardinal OC RAIC (born 1934) – architect of Canadian Museum of Civilization
 Mary Clark (born 1936) – architect and transportation planner
 Ernest Cormier OC RAIC (1885–1980) – architect of Supreme Court of Canada building
 A. J. Diamond OC RAIC (born 1934) – architect of Four Seasons Centre for the Performing Arts
 Margaret Synge Dryer (1921–1963) – architect
 Arthur Erickson CC RAIC (1924–2008) – architect of Simon Fraser University, Robson Square, and the Embassy of Canada in Washington
 David Ewart ISO (1841–1921) – Chief Dominion Architect (1896 to 1914), architect of Dominion Archives Building, Royal Canadian Mint, Victoria Memorial Museum, Connaught Building in Ottawa
 Étienne Gaboury RAIC OAA (1930–2022) – architect of the Embassy of Canada in Mexico and the Royal Canadian Mint building in Winnipeg
 Frank Gehry CC LLD (hc) PhD (hc) DEng (hc) DArch (hc) DA (hc) AIA (born 1929) – architect of Guggenheim Museum Bilbao, Experience Music Project, Walt Disney Concert Hall, and the Art Gallery of Ontario
 Dan Hanganu OQ DArch (hc) RAIC OAQ (1939–2017) – architect of Pointe-à-Callière Museum and Montreal Archival Centre
 Gregory Henriquez FRAIC OAA AIA (born 1963) RAIC – architect of the Woodward's Building, TELUS Garden, and redevelopment of Honest Ed's location.
 Stephen Irwin RAIC RIBA OAA (1939–2019) – architect of Purdy's Wharf
 Bruce Kuwabara FRAIC OAA AIA (born 1949) RAIC – architect of the Gardiner Museum, and Kitchener City Hall
 E. J. Lennox RAIC OAA (1854–1933) – architect of Old City Hall in Toronto, and Casa Loma
 John M. Lyle FRIBA OAA (1872–1945) RAIC – architect of the New York Public Library, the Royal Alexandra Theatre, and Toronto's Union Station
 Raymond Moriyama CC OOnt (born 1929) – architect of the Ontario Science Centre, Ottawa City Hall, and Canadian War Museum
 Samuel Oghale Oboh FAIA, FRAIC, Architect, AAA (born 1971) – 2015 President of the RAIC – architect of the International Law Enforcement Academy Botswana and the Botswana Police College; Lead Architect of the Alberta Legislature Centre Redevelopment Master Plan
 John Ostell (1813–1892) – architect of the McGill University Arts Building, and the Montreal Custom House
 Francis Rattenbury RAIC AIBC (1867–1935) – architect of the British Columbia Parliament Buildings, and the Empress Hotel
 Moshe Safdie CC LLD (hc) FRAIC FAIA (born 1938) – architect of Habitat 67, the National Gallery of Canada, and Vancouver Library Square
 Fariborz Sahba (born 1948) Master's degree from Faculty of Fine Arts at the University of Tehran – architect of Lotus Temple, and Terraces (Baháʼí)
 Henry Sears  (1929–2003) – Massey medal-winning architect, urban and gallery planner
 Brigitte Shim (born 1958) – Order of Canada for architecture, and Integral House
 Bing Thom CM FRAIC AIBC (1940–2016) – architect of Central City Centre
 Ronald Thom FRAIC AIBC (1923–1986) – architect of Massey College, the Shaw Theatre, and Trent University
 Bob Topping RAIC OAA (born 1954) – Accessibility and Universal Design specialist

Artists

Actors

Animators
 Ryan Larkin (1943–2007) – nominated for an Academy Award for Best Short Film, Walking, 1969

Broadcasters

Comedians

Musicians

Visual arts

Cartoonists
 Danny Antonucci (born 1957) – creator of Ed Edd n Eddy
 Kate Beaton (born 1983) – creator of Hark! A Vagrant
 Chester Brown (born 1960) – creator of Yummy Fur, Underwater and Louis Riel
 John Byrne (born 1950) – influenced superhero characters like The Fantastic Four and Superman
 Andy Donato (born 1937) – editorial cartoonist for the Toronto Sun
 Hal Foster (1892–1982) – artist for Tarzan comic strip, creator of Prince Valiant
 J.D. Frazer (born 1965) (moniker: Illiad) – creator of the webcomic User Friendly
 Gregory Gallant (born 1962) (moniker: Seth) – creator of Palookaville
 Lynn Johnston CM OM (born 1947) – creator of For Better or For Worse
 John Kricfalusi (born 1955) (moniker: John K.) – creator of Ren and Stimpy
 Graeme MacKay (born 1968) – editorial cartoonist
 Sean Martin (1950–2020) – creator of the print and webcomic "Doc and Raider"
 Todd McFarlane (born 1961) – creator of Spawn
 Win Mortimer (1919–1998) – illustrator for DC Comics' Superman and Batman
 Terry Mosher OC DLitt (hc) (born 1942) (moniker: Aislin)  –Montreal Gazette newspaper
 Len Norris (1919–1997) – long-time editorial columnist for the Vancouver Sun
 Ryan North (born 1980) – creator of the webcomic Dinosaur Comics
 Scott Ramsoomair (born 1981) – creator of the webcomic VG Cats
 Joe Shuster (1914–1992) – co-creator of Superman
 Dave Sim (born 1956) – creator of Cerebus the Aardvark
 Fiona Staples (born 1984) – co-creator of Saga
 Paul Szep (born 1941) – editorial cartoonist for the Boston Globe from 1967 to 2001
 Ben Wicks CM (1926–2000) – illustrator, comic strip cartoonist, and humanitarian

Astronauts

 Roberta Bondar OC OOnt ScD (hc) FRCP(C) FRSC (born 1945) – first Canadian woman in space
 Marc Garneau CC CD ScD (hc) (born 1949) – first Canadian man in space
 Chris Hadfield OOnt MSC LLD (hc) DEng (hc) (born 1959) – first Canadian to walk in space, first Canadian to command the International Space Station
 Steven MacLean ScD (hc) (born 1954)
 Julie Payette CQ FMC (born 1963)
 David Saint-Jacques B.Eng., Ph.D., M.D. (born 1970)
 Robert Thirsk (born 1953) – holds Canadian record for longest time spent in space
 Bjarni Tryggvason ScD (hc) (born 1945)

Athletes

Businesspeople and entrepreneurs
 Max Aitken, 1st Baron Beaverbrook, Baron Beaverbrook PC (1879–1964) – publishing baron, entrepreneur
 Francesco Aquilini (born 1969) – Chairman of the Aquilini Investment Group and owner of the Vancouver Canucks
 David Asper (born 1958) – chairman, Canwest Global Communications
 Izzy Asper OC QC OM (1932–2003) – chairman, Canwest Global Communications
 Jeannine Bailliu – economist, policy advisor at the Bank of Canada
 Conrad Black – Lord Black of Crossharbour KCSG LLD (hc) (born 1944) – entrepreneur, publisher
 Willard Boyle (1924–2011) – invented charge-coupled device
 Edgar Bronfman, Sr. (1929–2013) – head of Seagram's and long-time president of the World Jewish Congress
 Samuel Bronfman CC (1889–1971) – founder of Seagram's
 Robert Campeau (1923–2017) – real-estate mogul
 Jack Kent Cooke (1912–1997) – owner of the Los Angeles Lakers, Los Angeles Kings, Washington Redskins and the Chrysler Building
 James Alexander Cowan (1901–1978) – public relations consultant and founder of Stratford Shakespeare Festival
 Samuel Cunard Bt (1787–1865) – founder of Cunard Line
 William Davidson (1740–1790) – lumberman, shipbuilder, merchant
 Christine M. Day (born 1962) – former CEO of the Canadian clothing company Lululemon Athletica
 Michael DeGroote OC (born 1932) – businessman and philanthropist
 Paul Desmarais PC CC (1927–2013) – Chairman, Power Corporation of Canada

 Craig Dobbin OC (1935–2006) – founder, chairman and CEO of CHC Helicopter Corporation
 Denzil Doyle (born 1932/1933) – founding President of Digital Equipment Corporation's Canadian subsidiary
 James Hamet Dunn Bt (1874–1956) – financier, steel magnate
 Timothy Eaton (1834–1907) – founder of Eaton's department stores
 Bernie Ebbers (1941–2020) – former CEO of WorldCom
 Alfred Fuller (1885–1973) – Fuller Brush Company
 Arcadi Gaydamak (born 1952) – owner of Beitar Jerusalem
 Percy Girouard KSMG (1867–1932) – railway builder, governor
 Angèle Grenier – maple syrup producer known for her legal battles with the Federation of Quebec Maple Syrup Producers
 Charles Guillimin (1676–1739) – shipbuilder, merchant and moneylender
 Zabeen Hirji (born 1960) – Chief Human Resources Officer, Royal Bank of Canada
 Janet Holder – business executive, head of Enbridge Northern Gateway Pipelines
 Robin Ingle – CEO and Chairman of the Ingle Group of Companies
 K. C. Irving OC ONB (1899–1992) – industrialist
 Suresh Joachim (born 1968) – co-founder of WBBAS, No Poverty No Disease No War, World Peace Marathon and Suresh Joachim International Group Of Companies
 F. Ross Johnson (1931–2016) – former CEO of RJR Nabisco
 Ron Joyce CM (1930–2019) – original partner with Horton in Tim Hortons, primary builder of the chain
 Moez Kassam (born 1980) – hedge fund manager, founder of Anson Group
 Izaak Walton Killam (1885–1955) – major financier
 James L. Kraft (1874–1953) – entrepreneur and inventor, founder of  L. Kraft & Bros. Company, which later became Kraft Foods Inc
 Guy Laliberté OC CQ (born 1959) – founder and owner of the Cirque du Soleil
 Bernard Lamarre (1931–2016) – Chairman & C.E.O., Lavalin Group, 1972–1991; senior advisor, SNC-Lavalin Inc., 1991–2016
 Cindy Lee – founder of T & T Supermarket
 Michael Lee-Chin LLD (hc) (born 1951) – CEO of AIC Diversified Canada Split Corp. and the National Commercial Bank of Jamaica
 Li Ka-shing (born 1928) – Chairman of the Board of Cheung Kong Holdings and Hutchison Whampoa
 Victor Li (born 1964) – deputy chairman of Cheung Kong (Holdings) Limited
 William Secondo Lombardo (1930–2009) – owner of Lombardo Construction and CEO of Peerless-Cascade Plastics
 Pete Luckett (born 1953) – owner of Pete's Frootique and host of The Food Hunter
 William Christopher Macdonald (1831–1917) – tobacco manufacturer, education philanthropist
 Terry Matthews OC FREng (born 1943) – entrepreneur, chairman of Mitel and Wesley Clover
 Louis B. Mayer (1885–1957) – co-founder of Metro-Goldwyn-Mayer (MGM) Studios
 Harrison McCain CC ONB (1927–2004) – New Brunswick potato magnate
 Colonel Samuel McLaughlin CC CD ED (1871–1972) – Buick automobile manufacturer
 Simon McTavish (1750–1804) – fur trader
 Hartland Molson OC GOQ OBE (1907–2002) – Senator, President of Molson Breweries
 John Molson (1763–1836) – founder of Molson Breweries
 Peter Munk OC (1927–2018) – founder of Barrick Gold
 Jim Pattison CM OBC (born 1928) – chairman, president, CEO, and owner of the Jim Pattison Group
 Pierre Péladeau CM OQ (1925–1997) – founder of Quebecor Inc.
 Pierre Karl Péladeau (born 1961) – President, CEO of Quebecor Inc., Québecor Média Inc. and Sun Media Corporation
 Marie Penny (died 1970) – owner and operator of one of the largest 20th-century frozen fish companies in Newfoundland
 John Draper Perrin (1890–1967) – entrepreneur, financier, mining executive
 Richard Porritt OC (1901–1985) – mining industry executive
 Jean Pouliot (1923–2004) – founder of CFCF et Télévision Quatre Saisons
 John Redpath (1796–1869) – canal builder, sugar refinery founder
 Paul Reichmann (1930–2013) – developer of Canary Wharf
 Edward Samuel Rogers OC (1933–2008) – president and CEO of Rogers Communications
 John Roth (born 1942) – former CEO of Nortel Networks
 Lino Saputo (born 1937) – founder of Saputo
 Isadore Sharp OC (born 1931) – founder of the Four Seasons Hotel chain
 E.D. Smith (1858–1943) – founder of E.D. Smith & Sons Ltd
 Levy Solomons (1730–1792) – merchant and fur trader
 John F. Stairs (1848–1904) – entrepreneur, statesman
 Frank Stronach CM (born 1932) – entrepreneur, founder of Magna International
 E. P. Taylor (1901–1989) – entrepreneur, thoroughbred horse breeder
 Nat Taylor (1906–2004) – originator of Cineplex Entertainment
 Kenneth Thomson, Baron Thomson of Fleet (1923–2006)
 Roy Thomson, Baron Thomson of Fleet GBE  (1894–1976) – entrepreneur, publisher
 William Cornelius Van Horne KCMG (1843–1915) – constructed the Canadian Pacific Railway
 Jack L. Warner (1892–1978) – founder of Warner Bros. Studios
 Galen Weston OC OOnt (1940–2021) – owner of Loblaws, Holt Renfrew, and Selfridges
 Chip Wilson (born 1956) – founder of Lululemon Athletica
 Walter Wolf (born 1939) – oil drilling equipment supplier and Formula 1 team owner
 Bob Young (born 1953/1954) – self-publishing website, owner of CFL Hamilton Tiger Cats

Criminals and suspects
 Marie-Joseph Angélique (1710–1734) – executed for setting the city of Montreal on fire
 Johnson Aziga (born 1956) – first person to be charged with first-degree murder in Canada for spreading HIV
 Paul Bernardo (born 1964) – serial killer, serial rapist
John Hamilton (1899–1934) – bank robbery, killer
 Richard Blass (1945–1975) – multiple murderer
 Edwin Alonzo Boyd (1914–2002) – bank robber
 Alfonso Caruana (born 1946) – mobster
 Paul Joseph Cini (born 1941) – Canada's first skyjacker, sentenced to life imprisonment
 Jacques Cossette-Trudel (born 1947) – FLQ terrorist
 Louise Cossette-Trudel (born 1947) – FLQ terrorist
 Vincenzo Cotroni (1911–1984) – mobster
 Frank Cotroni (1931–2004) – mobster
 John Martin Crawford (1962–2020) – serial killer
 Raynald Desjardins (born 1953) – mobster
 Evelyn Dick (born 1920) – convicted of infanticide; convicted and acquitted of having murdered her husband
 Terry Driver (1965–2021) – murderer
 Larry Fisher (1949–2015) – convicted of the murder for which David Milgaard (see "Wrongfully convicted", below) was originally convicted and subsequently exonerated
 Charles Guité (born c. 1943) – fraud
 Karla Homolka (born 1970) – serial killer
 Bindy Johal (1971–1998) – Vancouver gangster
 Jacques Lanctôt (born 1945) – FLQ terrorist
 Yves Langlois (born 1947) – FLQ terrorist
 Robert Latimer (born 1953) – convicted of second-degree murder
 Allan Legere (born 1948) – serial killer
 Blake Leibel (born 1981) – murderer 
 Marc Lépine (1964–1989) – mass murderer
 Denis Lortie (born 1959) – murderer
 Luka Rocco Magnotta (born 1982) – murderer
 Grace Marks (c. 1828–after c. 1873) – convicted of murder in 1843
 Bruce McArthur (born 1951) – serial killer
 Allan McLean (1855–1881) – son of Fort Kamloops Chief Trader and leader and eldest of the group known as the Wild McLean Boys, who went on a killing spree with his brothers and accomplice Alex Hare in the British Columbia Interior in 1876
 Paddy Mitchell (1942–2007) – bank robber, leader of The Stopwatch Gang
 Kenneth Murdock (born 1963) – hitman
 Clifford Olson (1940–2011) – serial child murderer
 Johnny Papalia (1924–1997) – mobster
 Rocco Perri (1887–c. 1944) – gangster, bootlegger
 Robert Pickton (born 1949) – serial murderer
 Monica Proietti (1940–1967) – bank robber
 Louis Riel (1844–1885) – executed for treason
 Lucien Rivard (c. 1915–2002) – narcotics smuggler
 Nicolo Rizzuto (1924–2010) – mobster
 Vito Rizzuto (1946–2013) – mobster
 Paul Rose (1943–2013) – FLQ terrorist
 Frank "Dunie" Ryan (1942–1984) – gangster
 Pietro Scarcella (born 1950) – mobster
 Jeffrey Shuman (born 1962) – bank robber
 Francis Simard (1946–2015) – FLQ terrorist
 Slumach (died 1891) – Katzie man convicted and hung for the murder of Louis Bee, a Kanaka (Hawaiian) half-breed
 Cathy Smith (1947–2020) – convicted of manslaughter in death of John Belushi
 Stanley James Tippett - kidnapper and rapist
 Colin Thatcher (born 1938) – murderer
 Mark Twitchell (born 1979) – murderer
 Paolo Violi (1931–1978) – mobster
 Paul Volpe (1927–1983) – mobster
 Elizabeth Wettlaufer (born 1955) – serial killer
 Russell Williams (born 1963) – former RCAF military pilot and wing commander; convicted murderer, rank and decorations revoked upon conviction
 Gabriel Wortman (1968–2020) – mass murderer
 Rocco Zito (1928–2016) – mobster

Wrongfully convicted or lynched
 Robert Baltovich (born 1965) – wrongfully convicted of murder
 Donald Marshall, Jr. (1953–2009) – wrongfully convicted of murder
 David Milgaard (1952–2022) – wrongfully convicted of murder
 Guy Paul Morin (born 1961) – wrongfully convicted of murder
 Louie Sam (c. 1870–1884) – wrongfully accused of murder and hanged by lynch mob in Whatcom County, Washington
 Steven Truscott (born 1945) – wrongfully convicted of murder

Directors

Educators
 J. Willis Ambrose (1911–1974) – Professor at the Queen's University at Kingston
 Richard Lee Armstrong FRSC (1937–1991) – University of British Columbia professor, geochemist
 Martha Black – art historian, curator and author
 Marguerite Bourgeoys (1620–1700) – founder of the Congregation of Notre Dame of Montreal
 Stephen E. Calvert FRSC (born 1935) – University of British Columbia emeritus professor, geologist, oceanographer
 Petr Cerny (1934–2018) ScD (hc) FRSC – University of Manitoba professor, mineralogist and crystallographer
 Henry C. Gunning ScD (hc) FRSC (1901–1991) – University of British Columbia professor, geologist
 Aleksis Dreimanis (1914–2011) – University of Western Ontario emeritus professor, quaternary geologist
 James E. Gill (1901–1980) – McGill University professor, geologist
 James Edwin Hawley (1897–1965) – Professor at Queen's, geologist (Hawleyite)
 Frank Hawthorne OC FRSC (born 1946) – University of Manitoba professor, mineralogist and crystallographer
 Adelaide Hoodless (1858–1910) – education and women's activist
 Michael Ignatieff (born 1947) – University of Toronto, Harvard University, University of Oxford and University of Cambridge professor, political science
 Sue Johanson CM (born 1930) – sex educator
 Michael John Keen (1935–1991) – Dalhousie University professor, marine geoscientist
 Sean Kelly (born 1940) – Pratt Institute, NYC, Humanities & Media Studies, writer
 J. Ross Mackay OC FRSC (1915–2014) – University of British Columbia professor, geologist
 Eric W. Mountjoy FRSC (1931–2010) – McGill University professor, geologist
 Gerard V. Middleton FRSC (1931–2021) – McMaster University professor, geologist
 Anthony J. Naldrett FRSC (1933–2020) – University of Toronto emeritus professor, geologist
 Santa J. Ono FCAHS (born c. 1962) – University of British Columbia 15th President & Vice-Chancellor, professor, medical scientist
 William Richard Peltier ScD (hc) FRSC (born c. 1942) – University of Toronto professor, physicist
 Jordan Peterson (born 1962) – Canadian clinical psychologist and professor of psychology at the University of Toronto.
 Paula Rochon – Chair in Geriatric Medicine at the University of Toronto in 2022.
 Egerton Ryerson (1803–1882) – public education advocate
 Dora Sakayan (born 1931) – full professor, Department of German Studies, McGill University; Armenology, Contrastive Linguistics, Language Acquisition, Translation, Genocide Studies
 Colin Simpson (born c. 1965) – George Brown College, best-selling author
 Charles R. Stelck OC ScD (hc) FRSC (1917–2016) – University of Alberta professor, petroleum geologist, paleontologist, stratigrapher
 David Strangway OC ScD (hc) FRSC (1934–2016) – geophysicist and university administrator
 Thomas Symons CC OOnt (1929–2021) – Founding President of Trent University, Professor of Canadian Studies
 Claude Vivier (1948–1983) – organ pedagogue and professor at Collège Montmorency 
 Roger G. Walker FRSC – McMaster University emeritus professor
 William Winegard PC OC (1924–2019) – educator, engineer, scientist and former Member of Parliament

Environmentalists
See Canadian environmentalists.

Fashion
 Jeanne Beker (born 1952) – reporter
 Sahar Biniaz (born November 17, 1985) – model
 Dean and Dan Caten (born 1965) – designers known as Dsquared
 Keshia Chanté (born 1988) – model and singer
 Steven Cojocaru (born 1970) (known as Cojo) – critic and correspondent on Entertainment Tonight
 Taryn Davidson (born 1991) – model
 Linda Evangelista (born 1965) – model
 Shalom Harlow (born 1973) – model and actress
 Winnie Harlow (born 1994) – model 
 Irina Lazareanu (born 1982) – model
 Jay Manuel (born 1972) – expert on America's Next Top Model and Canada's Next Top Model
 Heather Marks (born 1988) – model
 Kenneth G. Mills (1923–2004) – designer
 Peter Nygard (born 1941) – designer
 Lana Ogilvie (born 1968) – model
 Coco Rocha (born 1988) – model
 Monika Schnarre (born 1971) – model
 Jessica Stam (born 1986) – model
 Ty States (born 1991) – model
 Daria Werbowy (born 1983) – Polish-born Canadian model
 Jason Wu (born 1982) – fashion designer, dolls artist

Humanitarians
 Louise Arbour (born 1947) – former UN High Commissioner for Human Rights, former justice of the Supreme Court of Canada, former Chief Prosecutor of the International Criminal Tribunals for the former Yugoslavia and Rwanda
 J. Esmonde Barry (1923–2007) – healthcare activist and political commentator in New Brunswick
 Norman Bethune (1890–1939) – physician and medical innovator
 Richard Maurice Bucke FRSC (1837–1902) – psychiatrist, philosopher, early author on human development and human potentials
 Steve Fonyo OC Rescinded 2010 (born 1966) – retraced and completed Terry Fox's cross country cancer research fundraising marathon
 Terry Fox CC OD (1958–1981) – attempted one-legged cross country run for cancer research
Marc Kielburger (born 1977) – author, social entrepreneur, columnist, humanitarian and activist for children's rights. co-founder, with his brother Craig, of the We Movement
 Grey Owl (1888–1938) (real name Archibald Stanfield Belaney)  – conservationist who falsely presented himself as an Aboriginal person and worked to save the beavers of Saskatchewan and Manitoba
 Rick Hansen CC OBC LLD (hc) DLitt (hc) (born 1957) – paraplegic athlete who completed an around-the-world marathon for spinal cord injury research
 Stephen Lewis CC (born 1937) – AIDS activist, United Nations special envoy for HIV/AIDS in Africa
 Harold A. Rogers OC OBE (1899–1994) – founder of Kin Canada
 Jean Vanier CC GOQ (1928–2019) – activist for the mentally disabled, founder of L'Arche

Inventors
 Scott Abbott  – co-inventor of Trivial Pursuit
 Thomas Ahearn PC(1855–1938) – invented the electric cooking range and the electric car heater
 Anthony R. Barringer (1925–2009) – holds 70 patents for mineral exploration technology
 Earl W. Bascom (1906–1995) – co-invented rodeo's side-delivery chute, invented reverse-opening side-delivery chute, hornless bronc saddle, one-hand bareback rigging and high-cut chaps
 Alexander Graham Bell (1847–1922) – born in Scotland, invented the telephone in Canada and developed it in the United States
 Joseph-Armand Bombardier (1907–1964) – invented the snowmobile
 Gerald Bull (1928–1990) – invented the G5 howitzer and the Iraqi supergun
 Herbert Henry Dow (1866–1930) – invented a method of bromine extraction known as the Dow process
 Mathew Evans – co-inventor of the first electric light bulb
 Charles Fenerty (c. 1821–1892) – inventor of the wood pulp process for making paper
 Reginald Fessenden (1866–1932) – radio inventor who made the first radio-transmitted audio transmission and the first two-way transatlantic radio transmission; also invented sonar and patented the first television system
 Sir Sandford Fleming KCMG DSc (hc) FRSC (1827–1915) – inventor of the system of Standard Time zones
 Wilbur R. Franks OBE (1901–1986) – invented the anti-black-out-suit (the G-suit)
 Abraham Pineo Gesner (1797–1864) – inventor of kerosene; known as the "father of the petroleum industry"
 James Gosling OC (born 1955) – invented Java computer language
 Chris Haney (1950–2010) – co-inventor of Trivial Pursuit
 Sam Jacks (1915–1975) – inventor of ringette
 George Klein OC MBE LLD (hc) (1904–1992) – developed: electric wheelchairs, microsurgical staple gun, the ZEEP nuclear reactor, and the Canadarm
James L Kraft (1874–1953) – entrepreneur and inventor, founder of L. Kraft & Bros. Company, which later became Kraft Foods Inc; patented processed cheese (AKA American cheese)
 Thomas Edvard Krogh ScD (hc) FRSC (1936–2008) – developed technique of radiometric uranium-lead dating to further the precision of geochronology
 Hugh Le Caine (1914–1977) – invented the music synthesizer in 1945
 Cluny MacPherson (1879–1966) – invented the first general-issue gas mask used by the British Army in World War I
 Wilson Markle (born 1938) – invented film colorization process in 1983
 Elijah McCoy (1844–1929) – developed automatic machinery lubricator, lawn sprinkler, the "Real McCoy"
 James Naismith (1861–1939) – invented basketball
 P. L. Robertson (1879–1951) – invented the Robertson screw
 Henry Ruttan (1792–1871) – invented air-conditioned railway coach
 Thomas F. Ryan (1872–1971) – invented five-pin bowling
 Arthur Sicard (1876–1946) – invented the snowblower in 1925
 Simon Sunatori (born 1959) – engineer, inventor and entrepreneur; created the MagneScribe and the Magic Spicer
 Lewis Urry (1927–2004) – invented the long-lasting alkaline battery
 Harry Wasylyk (1925–2013) – invented the disposable green polyethylene garbage bag in 1950
 Thomas Willson (1860–1915) – invented arc lamps and process for creating calcium carbide
 Henry Woodward – co-inventor of the first electric light bulb

Law
 Alfred Scow (1927–2013) – First Nations judge
 Catherine Latimer – lawyer and criminologist

Media
 Samantha Bee (born 1969) – host of Full Frontal with Samantha Bee
 Stephen Brunt (born 1959) – lead sports columnist for The Globe and Mail since 1989
 Stevie Cameron (born 1943) – journalist, author
 Richard Gizbert (born 1960)  cable network journalist of Al Jazeera English
 Gordon Donaldson (1926–2001) – amateur historian, journalist
 Barbara Frum OC LLD (hc) (1937–1992) – CBC radio and television journalist
 Jian Ghomeshi (born 1967) – former musician and radio broadcaster
 Ken Hechtman (born 1967) – maverick journalist jailed by Afghanistan's Taliban government as a suspected United States spy in 2001
 Kenny Hotz (born 1967) – only registered Canadian journalist to cover the Gulf War
 Mark Irwin CSC/ASC (born 1950) – Hollywood Director of Photography
 Peter Jennings CM (1938–2005) – ABC news anchor
 Jason Jones (born 1967) – senior correspondent for The Daily Show
 Pat Kiernan (born 1968) – morning anchor of NY1 since 1997
 Michael Kesterton (1946–2018) – The Globe and Mail columnist
 Lisa LaFlamme (born 1964) – journalist, occasional chief anchor, and senior editor for CTV National News
 Neil Macdonald (born 1957) – CBC reporter
 Robert MacNeil (born 1931) – journalist, author, longtime co-anchor of The MacNeil/Lehrer Report on PBS
 Peter Mansbridge OC LLD (hc) (born 1948) – news anchor of CBC's The National
 Rick Mercer OC  (born 1969) – comedian, TV personality, political satirist and author
 Mosha Michael (c. 1948–2009) – Canada's first Inuk filmmaker
 Margaret Lally "Ma" Murray (1888–1982) – editor and co-publisher of the Bridge River-Lillooet News
 Peter C. Newman CC CD LLD (hc) (born 1929) – eminent journalist and writer
 Sydney Newman OC (1917–1997) – supervisor of drama at the CBC, head of drama at the BBC, creator of the Doctor Who television series, chairman of the NFB
 Steve Paikin (born 1960) – journalist, film producer and author, best known for hosting TVOntario's Studio 2
 Pete Parker (1895–1991) – made the first ever broadcast of a professional hockey game
 Sandie Rinaldo (born 1950) – journalist and occasional news anchor for CTV National News
 John Roberts (born 1956) – Fox News Channel reporter, previously a CNN reporter and host of The New Music on MuchMusic
 Lloyd Robertson OC LLD (hc) (born 1934) – senior editor and former longtime anchor for CTV National News
 Morley Safer (1931–2016) – investigative journalist for CBS News and 60 Minutes
 Linus Sebastian (born 1986) – owner and founder of Linus Media Group
 Shane Smith (born 1969) – founder of Vice
 George Stroumboulopoulos (born 1972) – television journalist
 Peter Trueman OC (1934–2021) – original newsman on Global TV
 Jan Wong (born 1952) – journalist

Medical
 Evan Adams (born 1966) – First Nations medical doctor, medical advisor, Deputy Provincial Health Advisor (BC), and actor
 Maria Louisa Angwin (1849–1898) – first woman licensed to practice medicine in Nova Scotia
 Elizabeth Bagshaw CM (1881–1982) – physician and birth control activist
 Frederick Banting KBE MC LLD (hc) ScD (hc) FRSC (1891–1941) – Nobel laureate, co-discoverer of insulin
 John Cameron Bell (born 1953) – pioneer of oncolytic virus therapies for cancer
 Norman Bethune (1890–1939) – surgeon, inventor, socialist, battlefield doctor in Spain and China
 Wilfred Bigelow OC LLD (hc) FRSC (1913–2005) – inventor of the first artificial pacemaker
Yvette Bonny (born 1938) – pediatrician
 Basil Boulton (1938–2008) – pediatrician and child health advocate
 John Callaghan OC AOE (1923–2004) – pioneer of open-heart surgery
 John Dick FRSC (born 1954) – credited with discovery of cancer stem cell
 Tommy Douglas PC CC SOM LLD (hc) (1904–1986) – introduced publicly funded health care in Canada; commonly known as the "father of Medicare"
 Carl Goresky OC (1932–1996) – physician and scientist
 David H. Hubel (1926–2013) – Nobel Prize winner in medicine for mapping the visual cortex
 Harold E. Johns OC (1915–1998) – medical physicist, noted for his extensive contributions to the use of ionizing radiation to treat cancer
 Doreen Kimura (1933–2013) – behavioural psychologist, world expert on sex differences in the brain
 William Harding le Riche (1916–2010) – epidemiologist
 Jeanne Mance (1606–1673) – established the first hospital in North America – the Hôtel-Dieu de Montréal – in 1644
 Ernest McCulloch CM OOnt FRSC FRS (1926–2011) – cellular biologist credited with the discovery of stem cell with James Till
 Frances Gertrude McGill (1882–1959) – pioneering forensic pathologist and criminologist
 Henry Morgentaler CM LLD (hc) (1923–2013) – abortionist who helped legalize abortion in Canada and strengthen the power of jury nullification
 William Osler Bt (1849–1919) – physician, called the "father of modern medicine"; wrote Principles and Practice of Medicine
 Daniel David Palmer (1845–1913) – founded the chiropractic profession
 Edgar Randolph Parker (1871–1951) (known as "Painless" Parker) – flamboyant dentist
 Wilder Penfield OM CC CMG FRS (1891–1976) – neurosurgeon, discovered electrical stimulation of the brain
 Jack Pickup (1919–1996) – general practitioner and surgeon, also known as the "Flying Doctor of British Columbia"
 David Sackett  CC FRSC  (1934–2015) – founded the first department of clinical epidemiology in Canada at McMaster University
 Mary Elizabeth MacCallum Scott (1865–1941) – physician and missionary in Ceylon
 Sydney Segal  (1920–1997) – pediatrician and neonatologist particularly known for his work with sudden infant death syndrome
 James Till OC OOnt FRSC FRS (born 1931) – biophysicist, credited for the discovery of stem cell with Ernest McCulloch
 A. Ross Tilley (1904–1988)  MD FRCS(C) OBE OC – plastic surgeon
 Irene Ayako Uchida OC (1917–2013) – cytogenticist, Down Syndrome researcher

Military figures

 General Maurice Baril OMM CD (born 1943) – military advisor to the United Nations Secretary-General, head of the Military Division of the Department of Peacekeeping Operations of the United Nations, and Chief of the Defence Staff
 Gustave Biéler DSO MBE (1904–1944) – Special Operations Executive agent, executed by the Nazis
 Louis-Nicolas-Emmanuel de Bigault d'Aubreville – head of the nightwatch in Montreal 
 Air Commodore Leonard Birchall CM OBE DFC OOnt CD DMSc (hc) LLD (hc) (1915–2004) – war hero
 Air Marshall Billy Bishop VC CB DSO* MC DFC ED (1894–1956) (commonly known as Billy Bishop)  –World War I flying ace
 Brigadier-General Jean Boyle CMM CD (born 1947) – fighter pilot, and businessman
 Major General Sir Isaac Brock KB (1769–1812) – War of 1812 general
 Captain Roy Brown DSC* RNAS (1893–1944) – World War I fighter pilot officially credited with shooting down the Red Baron
 Colonel Lawrence Moore Cosgrave DSO* (1890–1971) – Canadian signatory to the Japanese Instrument of Surrender
 General Harry Crerar CH CB DSO CD PC (1888–1965) – "leading field commander" in World War II
 Lieutenant-General Sir Arthur Currie KCB GCMG (1875–1933) – first Canadian commander of the Canadian Expeditionary Force
 Lieutenant-General Roméo Dallaire OC CMM GOQ MSC CD LLD (hc) ScDHum (hc) DHL (hc) (born 1946) – UN peacekeeping General, attempted to prevent the Rwandan genocide
 Guy D'Artois DSO GM (1917–1999) – SOE agent, recipient of the Croix de Guerre
 General John de Chastelain CH OC CMM CD LLD (hc) ScDMil (hc) FLMH (born 1937) – head of the Independent International Commission on Decommissioning
 Peter Dmytruk (1920–1943) – WWII Flight Sergeant and member of the French Resistance
 Brigadier-General Dury, Charles PC OC QC CBE DSO (1912–1991) – soldier, businessman, and politician
 John Weir Foote VC CD (1904–1988) – military chaplain, Ontario cabinet minister, and recipient of the Victoria Cross
 Captain Nichola Goddard MSM (1980–2006) – first female Canadian soldier killed in combat
 William Hall VC (1827–1904) – first Nova Scotian recipient of the Victoria Cross
 John Kenneth Macalister (1914–1944) – SOE agent, executed by the Nazis
 Vice-Admiral Bruce MacLean CMM, CD – Chief of the Maritime Staff from 2004 to 2006
 Captain Simon Mailloux (born 1983) – first Canadian soldier with an amputation to deploy on a combat mission; recipient of the Sacrifice Medal
 Lieutenant Colonel John McCrae (1872–1918) – soldier, poet, author of In Flanders' Fields
 Alan Arnett McLeod VC (1899–1918) – fighter pilot, youngest Canadian-born winner of the Victoria Cross
 General Andrew McNaughton CH CB CMG DSO CD PC (1887–1966) – Co-Minister of Defence during World War II
 Lieutenant Colonel Theodore Meighen (1905–1979) – lawyer and philanthropist
 Lieutenant Colonel Charles Merritt VC (1908–2000) – recipient of the Victoria Cross
 Major General Sydney Chilton Mewburn PC (1863–1956) – lawyer and politician, Minister of Militia and Defence
 Minnie "Jerri" Mumford (1909–2002) – serving member of the Canadian Women's Army Corps (CWAC) during World War II
 Rear Admiral Leonard W. Murray (1896–1971) – Commander-in-Chief of the Canadian Northwest Atlantic during World War II
 Henry Norwest MM & Bar (1884–1918) – sniper in World War I
 Lieutenant-Colonel George Pearkes VC PC CC CB DSO MC CD (1888–1984) – recipient of the Victoria Cross, Lieutenant Governor of British Columbia
 Francis Pegahmagabow MM** (1891–1952) – the most highly decorated aboriginal Canadian soldier of World War I
 Frank Pickersgill (1915–1944) – SOE agent, executed by the Nazis
 Rear Admiral Desmond Piers CM DSC CD ScDMil (hc) (1913–2005) – war hero
 George Lawrence Price (1898–1918) – last soldier killed in World War I
 Tommy Prince MM (1915–1977) – one of Canada's most decorated soldiers, member of the Devil's Brigade
 James Ralston PC (1881–1948) – Co-Minister of Defence during World War II
 Thomas Ricketts VC (1901–1967) – recipient of the Victoria Cross (Newfoundlander at the time of his award)
 Harold A. Rogers OC OBE (1889–1994) – founder of Kin Canada
 Roméo Sabourin (1923–1944) – SOE agent, executed by the Nazis
 General Guy Simonds CC CB CBE DSO CD (1903–1974) – commander of the II Canadian Corps
 Ernest Smith (1914–2005) – VC, CM, OBC, CD, Seaforth Highlander Private/ Sergeant, the last living Canadian recipient of the Victoria Cross, awarded for gallantry in actions at the River Savio, Northern Italy 1944
 Sam Steele CB KCMG MVO (1851–1919) – member of the North-West Mounted Police, commander of Yukon detachment
 William Stephenson CC MC DFC (1897–1989) (codename: Intrepid) – senior representative of British intelligence for the Western Hemisphere in World War II
 Lieutenant-General Kenneth Stuart CB DSO MC (1891–1945) – Chief of the General Staff 1941–1943, educator
 Tecumseh (1768–1813) – Leader of First Nations British Allies, War of 1812, died defeating American invasion
 Rear Admiral Robert Timbrell CMM DSC CD (1920–2006) – first Canadian to be decorated with the Distinguished Service Cross
 General Christopher Vokes CB CBE DSO CD (1904–1985) – General Officer commanding the Canadian Army Occupation Force in Europe
 Brigadier Sir Edward Oliver Wheeler (1890–1962) – Corps of Royal Engineers surveyor
 General Ramsey Muir Withers CMM CD LLD (hc) (1930–2014) – Chief of the Defense Staff
 Sir James Lucas Yeo (1782–1818) – commander of Royal Navy forces in Canada during the War of 1812

Monarchs and Canadian Royal Family
Main articles:
 List of Canadian monarchs
 Canadian Royal Family

Magicians
 Shawn Farquhar (born 1962) – magician, winner of the Grand Prix Close Up at the 2009 FISM World Championship of Magic 
 Doug Henning (1947–2000) – credited with reviving the magic show in North America
 Leon Mandrake (1911–1993) – Mandrake the Great; and his sons Lon and Ron, born in 1948 and 1949, respectively
 James Randi (1928–2020) – magician, writer, skeptical investigator of paranormal and pseudo-scientific claims, founder of the James Randi Educational Foundation
 Dai Vernon (1894–1992) – magician, known as "the man who fooled Houdini"

Musicians

Politicians

 Lloyd Axworthy PC OC OM (born 1939) – former Cabinet minister
 Thomas Bain (1834–1915) – former Speaker of the Canadian House of Commons
 Robert Baldwin (1804–1858)
 Maude Barlow LLD (hc) DHL (hc) (born 1947) – activist, Chairperson of the Council of Canadians
 Perrin Beatty PC (born 1950) – former cabinet minister, president of CBC
 Monique Bégin PC OC ScD (hc) FRSC (born 1936) – former cabinet minister
 Thomas R. Berger OC OBC (1933–2021) – jurist
 Ethel Blondin-Andrew PC (born 1951) – former Cabinet minister
 Henri Bourassa (1868–1952) – Quebec politician
 Pierre Bourgault (1934–2003) – President of Rassemblement pour l'indépendance nationale
 Ed Broadbent PC CC (born 1936) – former New Democratic Party leader
 George Brown (1818–1880)
 Rosemary Brown PC CC OBC LLD (hc) (1930–2003)
 Tim Buck (1891–1973) – leader of the Canadian Communist Party
 George-Étienne Cartier Bt KSMG PC (1814–1873) – Cabinet minister
 Brock Chisholm CC MC* LLD (hc) (1896–1971) – first Director-General of the World Health Organization
 Joe Clark (born 1939) – 16th Prime Minister of Canada, leader of the Progressive Conservative Party of Canada from 1976 to 1983, and again from 1998 to 2003
 Sheila Copps PC (born 1952)
 Victor Copps (1919–1988) – Mayor of Hamilton
 John Lambton, 1st Earl of Durham, Earl of Durham GCB PC (1792–1840)
 Ellen Fairclough PC CC OOnt (1905–2004) – first female member of the Canadian Cabinet
 The Famous Five – 1920s women's rights activists
 Janice Filmon (born 1943) – Lieutenant Governor of Manitoba since 2015
 Iqwinder Singh Gaheer (born 1993) – member of Parliament for the riding of Mississauga—Malton
 Jennifer Granholm (born 1959) – first female governor of Michigan
 Gurmant Grewal (born 1957) – the "Ironman of Canadian Parliament"
 Nina Grewal (born 1958) – first South Asian and Sikh woman elected to Parliament; with her husband Gurmant, the Grewals are the first married couple to concurrently serve in Canadian Parliament
 Elijah Harper (1949–2013) – Cree chief (Red Sucker Lake Nation), MLA Manitoba, successfully blocked the Meech Lake Accord (proposed Constitutional amendment)
 C. D. Howe PC (1886–1960) – Cabinet minister
 Joseph Howe PC (1804–1873) – "father of Confederation"
 Stan Keyes PC (born 1953)
 Louis-Hippolyte Lafontaine Bt (1807–1864) – co-premier of the United Province of Canada
 Franklin K. Lane (1864–1921) – 1910s United States Secretary of the Interior (1913–1920)
 Jack Layton PC (1950–2011) – leader of the New Democratic Party
 William Lyon Mackenzie (1795–1861) – Mayor of Toronto
 Allan MacNab Bt (1798–1862) – Prime Minister of Upper Canada
 Thomas D'Arcy McGee PC (1825–1868)
 Agnes Macphail (1890–1954) – first female Member of Parliament (MP)
 Beverley McLachlin PC LLD (hc) (born 1943) – Chief Justice of Canada
 James McMillan (1838–1902) – US Senator from Michigan
 John Munro PC (1931–2003)
 Papineau (1786–1871) – reformer and 1837 rebellion leader
 Allan Studholme (1846–1919)
 Nathan Eldon Tanner (1898–1982)

Provincial premiers
Main articles:
 List of premiers of Alberta
 List of premiers of British Columbia
 List of premiers of Manitoba
 List of premiers of New Brunswick
 List of premiers of Newfoundland and Labrador
 List of premiers of Nova Scotia
 List of premiers of Ontario
 List of premiers of Prince Edward Island
 List of premiers of Quebec
 List of premiers of Saskatchewan

Territorial premiers
Main articles:
 List of premiers of the Northwest Territories
 List of premiers of Nunavut
 List of premiers of Yukon

Indigenous leaders

 Shawn Atleo (born 1967)
 William Beynon (1888–1958)
 Big Bear (1825–1888) – Cree leader
 Joseph Brant (1742–1807) – Mohawk leader
 Mary Brant (1736–1796) – leader of Six Nations women's federation
 Frank Calder (1877–1943) – Nisga'a
 Joe Capilano (c. 1854–1910) – Squamish
 Rose Charlie (born 1930)
 Arthur Wellington Clah (1831–1916)
 Heber Clifton (1871–1964)
 Cumshewa – 18th-century Haida chief at the inlet now bearing his name
 Harley Desjarlais
 Alfred Dudoward (ca. 1850–1914)
 Dan George (1899–1981) – Tsleil-Waututh (Burrard)
 Joseph Gosnell (1936–2020) – Nisga'a
 Simon Gunanoot (1874–1933) – Gitxsan
 Guujaaw (born 1953) – modern-day Haida leader
 Elijah Harper (1949–2013) – Cree
 Chief Hunter Jack (died 1905) – St'at'imc
 Mary John, Sr. (1913–2004)
 August Jack Khatsahlano (1877–1971) – Squamish
 Klattasine (died 1864) – Tsilhqot'in war chief, surrendered on terms of amnesty in times of war, hanged for murder
 Koyah (fl. 1787–1795) – 18th-century chief of the Haida 
 George Manuel (1921–1989)
 Maquinna – 18th-century Nuu-chah-nulth chief (Yuquot/Mowachaht)
 Harriet Nahanee (1935–2007) – Squamish and Nuu-chah-nulth (Pacheedaht)
 Nicola (1780/1785–c. 1865) – Grand chief of the Okanagan people, and jointly chief of the Nlaka'pamux-Okanagan-Nicola Athapaskan alliance in the Nicola Valley and of the Kamloops group of the Secwepemc
 Andy Paull (1892–1959) – Squamish
 Stewart Phillip
 Chief Poundmaker (c. 1842–1886) – Cree chief
 Piapot (c. 1816–1908) – Cree chief
 Steven Point (born 1951) – modern Sto:lo leader, current Lieutenant-Governor of British Columbia
 Louis Riel (1844–1885) – leader of two Métis rebellions before being hung for treason
 James Sewid (1913–1988) – Kwakwaka'wakw
 Tecumseh (1768–1813) – Shawnee leader
 Alec Thomas (1894–?)
 Wickanninish – 19th-century Nuu-chah-nulth chief (Opitsaht/Tla-o-qui-aht)
 Walter Wright (died 1949)

Producers

Religious figures

Martyrs
 St. Marguerite Bourgeoys (1620–1700) – first Canadian saint
 St. Noël Chabanel (1613–1649) – Jesuit missionary
 St. Anthony Daniel (1601–1648) – Jesuit missionary
 St. Jean de Brébeuf (1539–1649) – Jesuit missionary
 St. Jean de Lalande (died 1646)  – Jesuit missionary
 St. Saint Charles Garnier (1606–1649) – Jesuit missionary
 St. René Goupil (1608–1642) – first North American martyr of the Roman Catholic Church
 St. Isaacs Jogues (1607–1646) – Jesuit missionary
 St. Gabriel Lallemant (1610–1649) – Jesuit missionary

Religious community leaders
 Alexis André (1832–1893) – Catholic missionary priest, spiritual advisor to Louis Riel
 Aloysius Matthew Ambrozic (1930–2011) – Archbishop Emeritus of Toronto
 André Besette (1845–1937) – Holy Cross Brother known as the "Miracle Man of Montreal"
 Linda Bond (born 1946) – General of The Salvation Army, 2011–2013
 Arnold Brown (1913–2002) – General of The Salvation Army, 1977–81
 Hugh B. Brown (1883–1975) – Latter-day Saint apostle
 Ranj Dhaliwal (born 1976) – Sikh, writer, activist and co-founder of the Sikh Youth orthodox political party in Surrey, British Columbia
 Lionel Groulx (1878–1967) – Roman Catholic priest, historian, nationalist, and traditionalist
 Albert Lacombe (1827–1916) – Roman Catholic missionary
 John G. Lake (1870–1935) – leader of the Pentecostal Movement, born in St. Marys, Ontario
 Cardinal Paul-Émile Léger (1904–1991) – Catholic clergyman and humanitarian
 Merlin Lybbert (1926–2001) – general authority of the Church of Jesus Christ of Latter-day Saints
 David Mainse (1936–2017) – broadcaster, founder of 100 Huntley Street and CITS-TV
 Aimee Semple McPherson (1890–1944) – founder of the Foursquare Church
 William D. Morrow – General Superintendent of the Pentecostal Assemblies of Canada
 Bishop Michael Power (1804–1847) – Roman Catholic Bishop of Toronto
 Alexandre-Antonin Taché (1823–1894) – Roman Catholic priest, missionary of the Oblate order
 Nathan Eldon Tanner (1898–1982) – Latter-day Saint apostle
 John Taylor (1808–1887) – president of the Church of Jesus Christ of Latter-day Saints
 Kateri Tekakwitha (1656–1680) – "The Lily of the Mohawks", first Native American canonized as a saint by the Catholic Church
 Rúhíyyih Khanum (1910–2000) – wife of Shoghi Effendi, the head of the Baháʼí Faith until 1957; she was appointed as a Hand of the Cause; in 2004, CBC viewers voted her number 44 on the list of "greatest Canadians" on the television show The Greatest Canadian
 Bramwell Tillsley (1931–2019) – General of The Salvation Army, 1993–94
 Clarence Wiseman (1907–1985) – General of The Salvation Army, 1974–77

Religious cult figures
 Roch Thériault (1947–2011) – cult leader
 Brother XII (1878–1934) – cult leader

Scholars
 Louise Arbour (born 1947) – jurist
 Pratima Bansal – economist
 Timothy Brook (born 1951) – professor, historian and writer
 Joseph-Alphonse-Paul Cadotte (1897–1979) – professor, author
 Jack Chambers (born 1938) – linguist
 Thomas H. Clark (1893–1996) – McGill geology professor, namesake of Thomasclarkite
 Gerald Cohen (1941–2009) – Oxford Philosopher
 Northrop Frye (1912–1991) – influential critic, Shakespeare and Blake scholar
 John Kenneth Galbraith (1908–2006) – economist
 George Grant (1918–1988) – philosopher
 John Peters Humphrey (1905–1995) – legal scholar, principal drafter of the Universal Declaration of Human Rights
 Harold Innis (1894–1952) – political economist; author of seminal works on Canadian economic history, media and communications
 Marshall McLuhan (1911–1980) – communications theorist, coined phrases "the medium is the message" and "global village"
 Steven Pinker (born 1954) – psychologist, cognitive scientist, writer of popular science
 John Ralston Saul (born 1947) – businessman, essayist, diplomat
 F. R. Scott (1899–1985) – law professor, philosopher, poet
 Guy Sylvestre (1918–2010) – literary critic
 David Sztybel (born 1967) – philosopher
 Charles Taylor (born 1931) – philosopher
 William R. White (born 1943) - economist

Scientists
Robert Campbell Aitken (born 1963) – electrical engineer
Judie Alimonti (1960–2017) – immunologist
 Sidney Altman (1939–2022) – molecular biologist, winner of Nobel Prize in chemistry
Brenda Andrews (born 1957) – academic, researcher and biologist specializing in systems biology and molecular genetics.
 Albert Bandura (1925–2021) – psychologist
 Neil Banerjee – earth scientist 
 Karen Bailey – plant pathologist
 Karen Beauchemin (born 1956) – livestock ruminant nutrition
 Robert Bell FRSC (1841–1917) – geologist
 Walter A. Bell (1889–1969) – geologist, paleontologist
 Manjul Bhargava (born 1974) – mathematician and Fields medallist
 Selwyn G. Blaylock ScD (hc) (1879–1945) – chemist and mining executive
 Stewart Blusson OC (born 1939) – geologist, diamond prospector, multimillionaire and philanthropist
 Adolfo J. de Bold (born 1942) – biomedical scientist, discoverer of hormone secreted by heart muscle cells
 Willard Boyle (1924–2011) – inventor of the charge coupled device, winner of nobel prize in physics
 Bertram Brockhouse CC FRSC (1918–2003) – designer of the Triple-Axis Neutron Spectrometer, winner of Nobel Prize for Physics
 Georges Brossard CM CQ ScD (hc) (1940–2019) – entomologist, television personality and founder of the Montreal Insectarium
 Moira Brown – North Atlantic Right Whale researcher and conservationist
 Vernon Burrows (born 1930) – oat breeder
 John J. Clague FRSC (born 1946) – authority in quaternary and environmental earth sciences
 Kate Crooks (1833–1871) – botanist
 Claire Cupples – microbiologist
 Philip J. Currie (born 1949) – palaeontologist
 John William Dawson CMG FRS FRSC (1820–1899) – first Canadian-born scientist of worldwide reputation
 Duncan R. Derry LLD (hc) (1906–1987) – economic geologist
 Raymond Desjardins – agrometeorologist
 Donald B. Dingwell – earth scientist
 Martine Dorais – plant physiologist, organic horticulture
 Robert John Wilson Douglas FRSC (1920–1979) – petroleum geologist
 Eugenia Duodu – chemist
 Lorne Elias – chemist, inventor of the explosives vapour detector EVD-1
 John Charles Fields FRS FRSC (1863–1932) – mathematician and founder of the Fields Medal
 J. Keith Fraser (born 1922) – geographer
 Hu Gabrielse (born 1926) – geologist with the Geological Survey of Canada
 William Giauque (1895–1982) – Nobel Prize winner in chemistry
 Anne-Claude Gingras – molecular geneticist
 Cynthia Grant – soil fertility and crop nutrition specialist
 Donald O. Hebb FRS (1904–1985) – neuroscientist, published his theory of Hebbian learning
 Gerhard Herzberg PC CC ScD (hc) LLD (hc) FRSC FRS (1904–1999) – Nobel Prize winner in chemistry for molecular spectroscopy
 James Hillier OC (1915–2007) – inventor of the electron microscope
 Vanessa M. Hirsch – veterinary pathologist and virologist
 Paul F. Hoffman OC FRSC (born 1941) – geologist noted for research into Snowball Earth events
 Edward A. Irving CM ScD (hc) FRSC FRS (1927–2014) – provided the first physical evidence of continental drift
 Charles Legge (1829–1881) – civil engineer
 Victor Ling CC (born 1944) – medicine, drug resistance in cancer
 Sir William Edmond Logan FRS (1798–1875) – founded the Geological Survey of Canada
 Mary MacArthur – botanist, cytologist, horticulturalist
 John Macoun (1831–1920) – botanist
 Tak Wah Mak (born 1946) – immunologist who discovered the T-cell receptor
 Claude Hillaire-Marcel FRSC (born 1943) – world leader in quaternary research
 Rudolph A. Marcus (born 1923) – Nobel Prize in chemistry recipient for electron transfer reactions
 Jerrold E. Marsden (1942–2010) – applied mathematician, founder of the Fields Institute
 Ernest McCulloch CC FRSC FRS (1926–2011) – cellular biologist who, with James Till, demonstrated the existence of stem cells
 Maud Menten (1879–1960) – medical scientist, made groundbreaking work in enzyme kinetics
 Robert Mundell (1932–2021) – economist and Nobel laureate
 John Charles Polanyi PC CC FRSC FRS (born 1929) – Nobel Prize in chemistry recipient for infrared chemiluminescence
 Isabella Preston (1881–1965) – ornamental horticulturalist
 Raymond A. Price OC ScD (hc) FRSC (born 1933) – geologist
 Hubert Reeves CC OQ (born 1932) – astrophysicist and science popularizer
Soon Jai Park (1937–2018) – dry bean breeder
 Elizabeth Pattey – agricultural micrometeorologist
 Henry de Puyjalon   (1841–1905) – biologist and ecologist
 Carmelle Robert (born 1962) – astrophysicist
Laurie Rousseau-Nepton – astrophysicist, first indigenous woman in Quebec to obtain a PhD in astrophysics 
 Donald F. Sangster LLD (hc) ScD (hc) FRSC – geologist
 Charles E. Saunders (1867–1937) – agronomist
 Arthur Schawlow (1921–1999) – Nobel Prize winner in physics (for lasers)
 David Schindler OC (1940–2021) – limnologist
 Myron Scholes (born 1941) – Nobel Prize winner in economics
 Karen Schwartzkopf-Genswein – animal ethologist
 Hans Selye CC (1907–1982) – pioneering stress researcher
 Michael Smith CC OBE (1932–2000) – Nobel Prize winner in chemistry for site-based mutagenesis
 Ralph M. Steinman (1943–2011) – Nobel Prize winner in Physiology or Medicine for the discovery of the dendritic cell and its role in adaptive immunity
 Peter A Stewart (1921–1993) – physiologist, quantitative acid-base physiology
Donna Strickland (born 1959) – Nobel Prize winner in Physics, optical physicist and pioneer in the field of pulsed lasers
 Richard Summerbell (born 1956) – mycologist
 David Suzuki CC OBC LLD (hc) ScD (hc) ScDEnv (hc) ScDComm (hc) DHL (hc) (born 1936) – geneticist and science popularizer
 Felicitas Svejda (1920–2016) – horticulturalist
 Henry Taube FRSC (1915–2005) – Nobel Prize in chemistry for electron transfer reactions
 Richard Taylor CC FRSC FRS (1929–2018) – Nobel Prize in physics recipient for verifying the quark theory
 James Till CC FRS (born 1931) – biophysicist who, with Ernest McCulloch, demonstrated the existence of stem cells
 Joseph Tyrrell (1858–1957) – geologist, cartographer, discoverer of dinosaur bones in Alberta
 William Vickrey (1914–1996) – Nobel Prize winner in economics
 Harold Williams FRSC (1934–2010) – geologist, expert on the Appalachian Mountains
 John Tuzo Wilson CC OBE ScD (hc) FRSC FRS FRSE (1908–1993) – geophysicist, expert in plate tectonics

Singers

Viceroys
Main articles:
 List of Governors General of Canada
 List of Lieutenant Governors of Alberta
 List of Lieutenant Governors of British Columbia
 List of Lieutenant Governors of Manitoba
 List of Lieutenant-Governors of New Brunswick
 List of Lieutenant Governors of Newfoundland and Labrador
 List of Lieutenant Governors of Nova Scotia
 List of Lieutenant Governors of Ontario
 List of Lieutenant Governors of Prince Edward Island
 List of Lieutenant-Governors of Quebec
 List of Lieutenant Governors of Saskatchewan

Writers

Other personalities

 Alexandre Trudeau (born 1973) – author, filmmaker and journalist
 Janis Babson (1950–1961) – organ donor, subject of two books
 Antonio Barichievich (1925–2003) (known as The Great Antonio) – strongman, showman, and eccentric
 Grant Bristow (born 1958) – CSIS undercover agent who started the Heritage Front, planted as political operative within Reform Party
 René Lepage de Sainte-Claire (1656–1718) – lord-founder of Rimouski, Quebec
 Donnelly family (known as the Black Donnellys) – participants and/or victims of a vicious community feud
 Josiah Henson (1789–1883) – former slave, believed to be the inspiration for Uncle Tom's Cabin
 Harold Kandel (1906–1995) – legendary theatregoer from Toronto, Ontario known for speaking out during theatre events, now commemorated through the Harold Awards
 Marc Karam (born 1980) – professional poker player
 Anna Ruth Lang CV – recipient of the Cross of Valour
 Sunny Leone (born 1981) – Canadian and Indian pornographic actress; Bollywood actress
 Bat Masterson (1853–1921) – gunfighter, fight promoter, sports journalist
 Charles Vance Millar (1853–1926) – lawyer, financier, and posthumous practical joker
 Sorel Mizzi (born 1986) – professional poker player
 John Wilson Murray (1840–1906) – Canada's first major detective
 Daniel Negreanu (born 1974) – professional poker player
 Minnie Patterson (died 1911) – heroine noted for her daring rescue of men from the barkentine (barque) Coloma during a severe storm in 1906.
 Sue Rodriguez (1950–1994) – amyotrophic lateral sclerosis (ALS) sufferer and right to die advocate
 Alexander Milton Ross (1832–1897) (known as The Birdman) – pre-American Civil War abolitionist and participant in the Underground Railroad
 Craig Russell (1948–1990) – female impersonator and actor
 Laura Secord (1775–1868) – heroine of the War of 1812, warned the British of a surprise American attack at Battle of Beaver Dams
 Chris Sky (born 1983) – conspiracy theorist
 Joshua Slocum (1844–1909) – first man to sail around the world solo
 Margaret Trudeau (born 1948) – widow; former wife of Pierre Elliott Trudeau

Fictional Characters
 Amuro Ray – main character in the mecha anime Mobile Suit Gundam and varying roles in subsequent sequels
 Ike Broflovski – character on South Park
 Tom Evans (known as Captain Canuck) – cartoon character
 Benton Fraser – Mountie on the 90s television show Due South
 James Howlett (aka "Logan", aka "Wolverine") – member of the X-Men
 Justin Jones from Justin Time
 Rodney McKay – character on Stargate SG-1 and Stargate Atlantis
 Bob and Doug McKenzie – characters on SCTV
 Darren Oak (known as Captain Canuck) – cartoon character
 Trevor Philips – one of the three protagonists of Grand Theft Auto V
 Scott Pilgrim – from the graphic novel series of the same name
 Sergeant William Preston – heroic Mountie of radio and TV series from the 1950s
 Peter Puck – Hockey Night in Canada symbol from the 1970s
 Robin Scherbatsky – supporting character on the sitcom How I Met Your Mother
 Dave Semple (known as Captain Canuck)  – cartoon character
 Anne Shirley – known as Anne of Green Gables
 Terrance and Phillip – characters on South Park
 Wade Wilson (aka "Deadpool") – comic book anti-hero

Other
National
 Persons of National Historic Significance (Canada)
 List of Companions of the Order of Canada
 List of inductees of Canada's Walk of Fame
 The Greatest Canadian

Groupings and articles of relevance

 Aboriginal Canadian personalities
 Asian Canadians
 Black Canadians
 European Canadians
 List of First Nations people
 List of Canadian Jews
 List of Canadians by net worth

Lists by city
List of people from Canada by city

Lists by province/territory

References

External links

 The Dictionary of Canadian Biography  – biographies of Canadians from 1000 to 1930 CE
 Biographical Dictionary of Architects in Canada  – biographies of Canadian architects and lists of their buildings from 1800 to 1950
 "Canada Questions and Answers: Everything You Need to Know About Canada" by canadafaq.ca
 The Canadian Encyclopedia – click on "people" for links to articles about Canadians; English/French availability